14 Songs is the first official solo album from Paul Westerberg, former leader of The Replacements, after the final Replacements album, All Shook Down, was heavily packed with session musicians and marginalized the other three band members.

The album features contributions from Ian McLagan, former keyboardist for the Faces, a band that Westerberg has often cited as a favorite.

In an interview included with a special edition of the album, he explained that he started the record jamming with drummer Josh Kelly and former Georgia Satellites bassist Rick Price, but found that the combination wasn't working, requiring him to seek other players. (The only song featuring Kelly and Price is the opener, "Knockin' On Mine.") He also revealed that the album title was a reference to Nine Stories, by J.D. Salinger.

The CD version was packaged in book form, with the disc in a pocket inside the front cover. All numbered pages in the book are page 14, including six pages at the back for "Notes."

Reception

By March 1996, 14 Songs had sold over 161,000 copies in the United States.

Track listing

Personnel
 Paul Westerberg – guitar, keyboards, saxophone, vocals
 Matt Wallace – bass, percussion, drums, backing vocals
 John Pierce – bass, piano, backing vocals
 Rick Price – bass, mandolin, backing vocals
 Josh Freese – drums
 Josh Kelly – drums, backing vocals
 Ian McLagan – piano, backing vocals
 Michael Urbano – drums
 Suzanne Dyer – backing vocals
 Joan Jett – backing vocals
 Laurie Lindeen – backing vocals
 Brian MacLeod – drums, backging vocals

Technical personnel
 Produced by Paul Westerberg and Matt Wallace
 Mastered by Doug Sax
 Frank W. Ockenfels 3 - cover photography

References

External links

1993 debut albums
Albums produced by Matt Wallace
Paul Westerberg albums
Sire Records albums
Albums produced by Paul Westerberg